Bicester Rugby Union Football Club is an English rugby union club situated in Bicester, 10 miles North of Oxford.

The club provides rugby for children from the age of 4 (Under 5s, or School Reception Year) up to the Under 18 (Colts), two girls teams, and a senior section which includes the Women's team (Vixens), Bicester Men's 2nd XV, and 1st XV.

Bicester 1st XV participates in Southern Counties North following their relegation from South West 1 East at the end of the 2017–18 season. Bicester's U13s+ youth age grades and Seniors currently play at Whitelands Farm Sports Ground, whilst the Minis (up to U12s) are located at the Bicester Sports Association (BSA) Ground on Akeman Street, Chesterton..

In February 2020, the club was named national KidsFirst Champions by the Rugby Football Union in recognition of its focus on providing a positive development environment for mini youth rugby.

Bicester RUFC had played at the Oxford Road sports ground from the club's inception in 1948, until 2020. The ground, which was owned by the BSA, was sold to Bicester Village. Plans to expand the BSA site at Chesterton were refused by Cherwell District Council after concerns raised by Oxfordshire County Council Highways Department on transport and accessibility of the site.

Club Honours
1st Team:
Bucks & Oxon 2 champions: 1990–91
Berks/Bucks & Oxon 1 champions (2): 1991–92, 2001–02
Oxfordshire RFU County Cup winners (2): 1996, 1997
Southern Counties (north v south) promotion playoff winners: 2016-17

2nd Team:
Berks/Bucks & Oxon 2 North champions: 2007-08
Berks/Bucks & Oxon 1 North champions: 2008-09
Berks/Bucks & Oxon 3 champions (2): 2011–12, 2016–17

Notable players
 Andy Gomarsall – England International
 James Forrester – England International
 Haydn Morgan – Wales International, British & Irish Lions
 Jon Goodridge

Notes

References

External links
  Official Club Website

English rugby union teams
Bicester
Rugby union in Oxfordshire
Rugby clubs established in 1948
1948 establishments in England